Arovane is the recording name of German electronic music artist Uwe Zahn (born 1965 in Hameln, Germany). He also releases under the moniker Nedjev.

Life and career 
Zahn was born in Hameln in 1965. He first began experimenting with rudimentary audio equipment and keyboards when he was 15. Over the years he continued experimenting and developing his sound, even learning to play the clarinet at one point. In the late 80s he began dealing with synthesizers and turntablism as well as deconstruction of hip hop beats. In 1989 Zahn began creating music with a collective of electronic musicians in Munich. This collective, known as S.A.M., was dedicated to creating live, free, electronic improvisational music and operated in Germany.

In 1991 Zahn built his own studio in Berlin. The works around this time could be compared to a breakbeat influenced sound.

Throughout the 90s, Zahn lived in Berlin and continued creating electronic music. After working for a radio station, he caught the attention of electronic music label Din. The late 90s saw the release of his first two albums, Atol Scrap for Din Records and Tides for CCO Records, which gained him a degree of notoriety and acclaim mainly in Germany and then throughout the world in the IDM, ambient, and electronic music scene. There were also a number of compilation appearances and collaborations released during this time.

In 2004, Zahn's album Lilies was released. Significantly, the last track on that album is titled "Good Bye Forever" – after Lilies, there was a nine-year hiatus for Zahn's musical output which ended in 2013 with the release of Ve Palor on the n5MD label.

In 2018, Uwe was interviewed by the Data.Wave webzine.

The Arovane Sound 
Arovane's sound can be characterized as ethereal, melodic, organic, warm and ambient yet technically involved with structured, often heavy, breakbeat and hip hop influenced beats. It is richly layered with synths and textured distortions and focuses more on generating a melancholy nostalgic feeling than four-on-the-floor dance beats. The tempos are midrange and Arovane has been labelled as IDM, having his album Tides listed in Pitchfork's 50 Best IDM Albums of All Time.

Although the melodic richness remains intact, the resulting sound from the Arovane and Phonem collaboration Aer (Valid) is perhaps more robotic and cold than what could be considered typical Arovane and harkens back to some facets of Arovane's early works, such as Icol Diston.

Arovane can possibly be compared to a blend between the robotic glitch sound of early Autechre and the expansive open synth-laden fields of Boards of Canada. Zahn and his music are often referred to as being melodically advanced.

Tracks throughout Tides contain the gentle washing sounds of waves and tides and summer nights seamlessly comingling and modulating with arpeggieted-type synths and instruments backed with smooth distant organic and synthetic drums and basslines.

Discography

Albums 
Atol Scrap (Din, 1999)
Tides (City Centre Offices, 2000)
AER (Valid) (Vertical Form, 2001. A collaboration with Phonem)
Lilies (City Centre Offices, Indigo, 2004)
Ve Palor (n5MD, 2013)
In-between (A Strangely Isolated Place, 2015, A collaboration with Hior Chronik)
Kaziwa (Time Released Sound, 2016, A collaboration with Porya Hatami)
Into My Own (A Strangely Isolated Place, 2017, A collaboration with Hior Chronik)
Organisim (Karlrecords, 2017, A collaboration with Porya Hatami)
Reihen (12k, 2021)

Singles & EPs 
Icol Diston (Din, 1998)
I.O. (Din, 1998)
PInt (FWD:, 1999)
AMX (Din, 1999)
Occer / Silicad (City Centre Offices, 1999)
Yeer / Disper (Awkward Silence Recordings, 2000) Split EP with Christian Kleine.
Plecq  (Bip_Hop Generation v.2, 2001)
Cycliph (Din, 2002)
Minth / Neel (City Centre Offices, 2003)
Aarlenpeers (Touchin' Bass, 2015)

Compilations 
Icol Diston (Din, 2002. A collection of early releases)

References

External links 
 
 Arovane on Last.fm
 
 
 Hybrid Magazine - interview for Arovane productions.

German electronic musicians
Intelligent dance musicians
Ambient musicians
1965 births
Living people